Skip is a brand of laundry detergent manufactured and marketed by Unilever in France, Spain, Portugal, Greece, Cyprus, Argentina and South Africa. In the past it was also marketed in Germany, but it was discontinued in 2009. It is Unilever's top-of-line detergent brand in the countries where it is marketed and features the splodge-like logo similar to British Persil.

The brand was first introduced in 1959 in France, by the Lever brothers company, as a low-suds washing powder specially designed for automatic washing machines. During 1960s it was also introduced in other European countries such as Spain, Portugal and Greece. Since 1970s it also contains enzymes in its formula, being a biological detergent. In 1978 it became the first detergent powder that contained TAED bleach activators(marketed as TETRAED B). Today the range includes detergents in various forms such as powder, liquid, gel, tablets and liquid pods. It also includes some special products for clothing that needs special care such as wool, silk and black clothes. Its ingredients formula is similar to British Persil Bio or European Omo.

References

1959 establishments in France
Products introduced in 1959
Unilever brands
Laundry detergents
French brands